Amr or AMR may refer to:

Science, environment and medicine
 Antimicrobial resistance, of microorganisms (bacteria, viruses, parasites) to antimicrobials
 Anisotropic magnetoresistance, resistance varying with magnetic field
 Accelerating Moment Release, an earthquake precursor
 Advanced Modular Reactor, a proposed Small modular reactor design

Information technology
 Abstract Meaning Representation, a semantic annotation framework for natural language text
 Audio/modem riser, on a computer motherboard
 Adaptive Multi-Rate audio codec for speech coding
 Adaptive mesh refinement in numerical analysis
 AMR radiotelephone network (Czechoslovakia) (in Czech, Automatizovaný městský radiotelefon)
 Automatic meter reading, for utility meters
 Autonomous mobile robot, portable robots used in industrial applications

Companies
 Abbingdon Music Research, a UK audio manufacturer
 American Medical Response, a private ambulance operator
 AMR Corporation, former parent company of American Airlines
 Arcata and Mad River Railroad

Financial 
 Applicable Margin Reset, a procedure for changing the interest rate on CLOs

People
 Amr (name), an Arabic male given name

Military
 AMR 35, a French light tank
 Andrew Mlangeni Regiment, an infantry regiment of the South African Army
 Anti-materiel rifle, high caliber rifle

Other uses
 Advanced meat recovery or mechanically recovered meat
 amr, ISO 639-3 code for the Amarakaeri language of Peru
 Amersham station, UK National Rail Code
 Àmr, the seventh solo album by progressive black metal musician Ihsahn
 Aston Martin Racing, UK motor racing team

See also

 
 
 
 
 Amer (disambiguation)
 Amir (disambiguation)